George Ralph DiCenzo (April 21, 1940 – August 9, 2010) was an American actor, and one-time associate producer for Dark Shadows. He was in the show business for over 30 years, with extensive film, TV, stage, and commercial credits. DiCenzo notably played Marty's grandfather Sam Baines in the film Back to the Future. He also had a minor role in William Peter Blatty's The Exorcist III.

Life and career
DiCenzo was born in New Haven, Connecticut. He appeared in more than 30 feature films, including Close Encounters of the Third Kind (1977), The Choirboys (1977), The Frisco Kid (1979), The Ninth Configuration (1980), Back to the Future (1985), About Last Night (1986), Walk Like a Man (1987), The New Adventures of Pippi Longstocking (1988), 18 Again! (1988), Sing (1989) and The Exorcist III (1990).

He appeared in Hotel, directed by Mike Figgis, and Tempted, directed by Bill Bennett. He also played the late baseball commissioner A. Bartlett Giamatti in the television movie Hustle about disgraced baseball great Pete Rose. In 2002 George played Ennio Salieri in the 2002 video game Mafia. George also provided the voice for Earnest Kelly in Grand Theft Auto: Vice City.

In 1976, he appeared in the CBS made-for-TV movie Helter Skelter as prosecuting attorney Vincent Bugliosi. In the 1981–82 television season, DiCenzo was a regular on McClain's Law, with James Arness and Marshall Colt, starting with the television film McClain's Law, structured as the series' pilot. He appeared in the 1977 miniseries Aspen, the 1980 TV movie The Night the City Screamed, and made regular appearances on Murder, She Wrote, Law & Order and NYPD Blue. 

His own series included Equal Justice and Joe's Life in the early and mid-1990s. He appeared as a guest star in the Law & Order: Criminal Intent episode "Semi-Professional". In the early 1990s, DiCenzo appeared on Broadway with Nathan Lane in On Borrowed Time.

DiCenzo's voice can be heard in commercials, audiobooks, and cartoon series. His roles in the latter include the title character in BlackStar (1981),  Hordak in She-Ra: Princess of Power (1985–1986), and Captain America in both Spider-Man (1981 TV series) as well as Spider-Man and His Amazing Friends (1981-1983).
He was an acting teacher in New York City and Philadelphia for several years. He apprenticed under his mentor Milton Katselas at the Beverly Hills Playhouse.

Death
DiCenzo died of sepsis on August 9, 2010 at the age of 70. He was buried in the North and Southampton Churchyard at Churchville, Bucks County, Pennsylvania.

Filmography

 House of Dark Shadows (1970) - Deputy (uncredited)
 Going Home (1971) - Sergeant
 Across 110th Street (1972) - Patrolman
 Gunsmoke (1973, 1975) - Newt / Mr. Bruce
 Shoot It Black, Shoot It Blue (1974) - George
 The Swiss Family Robinson (1975) - Suramin
 Las Vegas Lady (1975) - Eversull
 Helter Skelter (1976) - Vincent Bugliosi
 Close Encounters of the Third Kind (1977) - Major Benchley
 The Choirboys (1977) - Lt. Grimsley
 The Frisco Kid (1979) - Darryl Diggs
 The Ninth Configuration (1980) - Capt. Fairbanks
 Gangster Wars (1981) - Arnold Rothstein
 McClain's Law (1981) - Lt. DeNisco 
 Breach of Contract (1983)
 The Secret of the Sword (1985) - Bow / Hordak (voice)
 Back to the Future (1985) - Sam Baines
 The Longshot (1986) - DeFranco
 About Last Night (1986) - Mr. Favio
 Omega Syndrome (1986) - Philadelphia 'Phil' Horton
 Walk Like a Man (1987) - Bob (Bub) Downs
 The New Adventures of Pippi Longstocking (1988) - Mr. Blackhart
 18 Again! (1988) - Coach
 Sing (1989) - Mr. Marowitz
 Face of the Enemy (1989) - James Wald
 The Exorcist III (1990) - Stedman
 Gypsy Eyes (1992) - Wyden
 Lesser Prophets (1997) - Jerry
 Illuminata (1998) - Jailor
 It Had to Be You (2000) - Mel
 Tempted (2001) - Byron Blades
 Hotel (2001) - Boris
 Stateside (2004) - Detective #2
 A Guide to Recognizing Your Saints (2006) - Uncle George (final film role)

References

External links

1940 births
2010 deaths
American male film actors
American male television actors
American male voice actors
Deaths from sepsis
Filmation people
Male actors from New Haven, Connecticut
Union College (New York) alumni
20th-century American male actors
21st-century American male actors